Batman: The Return may refer to:
 Bruce Wayne: The Road Home, a DC Comics series
 Batman: The Return of Bruce Wayne, a DC Comics miniseries